The Pulaski Bridge in New York City connects Long Island City in Queens to Greenpoint in Brooklyn over Newtown Creek.  It was named after Polish military commander and American Revolutionary War fighter Casimir Pulaski in homage to the large Polish-American population in Greenpoint. It connects 11th Street in Queens to McGuinness Boulevard (formerly Oakland Street) in Brooklyn.

Description

Designed by Frederick Zurmuhlen, the Pulaski Bridge is a bascule bridge, a type of drawbridge. It carries six lanes of traffic and a pedestrian sidewalk over the water, Long Island Rail Road tracks, and the entrance to the Queens-Midtown Tunnel. The pedestrian sidewalk is on the west or downstream side of the bridge, which has views of the industrial areas surrounding Newtown Creek, the skyline of Manhattan, and of a number of other bridges, including the Williamsburg Bridge, the Queensboro Bridge, and the Kosciuszko Bridge. The bridge was reconstructed between 1991 and 1994.

History
The Pulaski Bridge opened to traffic on September 10, 1954. It served as a replacement for the nearby Vernon Avenue Bridge, which had linked Vernon Avenue in Long Island City with Manhattan Avenue in Greenpoint.

From 1979 until 1990, a message reading "Wheels Over Indian Trails" was painted on the Pulaski Bridge over the approach to the Queens-Midtown Tunnel. The artwork was created by John Fekner as a tribute to the thirteen Native American tribes who inhabited Long Island.

In 2012, in response to the lack of adequate bicycle facilities currently on the Pulaski Bridge, the NYC Department of Transportation began studying the possibility of installing dedicated bicycle lanes on the bridge.  Since the Pulaski is a drawbridge with an open section in the middle, it presents several challenges not faced by other bridges. First, physical dividers must be lightweight yet securely installed so they don't come loose when the drawbridge is opened. Secondly, the joints where the two leaves come together must be somehow protected to make them more bicycle wheel-friendly. In April 2013, in a letter to Assembly Member Joe Lentol, the NYC Department of Transportation Commissioner stated that the proposal for a two-way dedicated bike lane, which would convert the existing walkway to a pedestrian-only path, had met the requirements of a traffic analysis and that an engineering study and recommendations would be made by the end of the year. On October 25, 2013, Lentol announced that the DOT was in the process of designing a dedicated bike lane and that the final design would be presented to community board 1 in Brooklyn and Community Board 2 in Queens before the end of the year.  Bike lane construction was originally projected to occur late spring or early summer of 2014. Construction occurred during the winter of 2015 and the bike lane opened at the end of April 2016.

References

External links 

 NYC DoT page
 

Bascule bridges in the United States
Bridges completed in 1954
Road bridges in New York City
Bridges in Queens, New York
Bridges in Brooklyn
Long Island City
Greenpoint, Brooklyn
Pedestrian bridges in New York City
1954 establishments in New York City
Monuments and memorials to Casimir Pulaski